Brunswick Street may refer to:

Brunswick Street, Brisbane, Australia 
Brunswick Street railway station, former name of Fortitude Valley railway station, Brisbane
Brunswick Street, Melbourne, Australia
Brunswick Street Oval, Australian rules football and cricket ground
 Great Brunswick Street, Dublin Ireland, former name of Pearse Street